Cumberland County is a county located in the U.S. state of North Carolina. As of the 2020 census, the population was 334,508, making it the fifth-most populous county in North Carolina. Its county seat is Fayetteville. Cumberland County is part of the Fayetteville, NC Metropolitan Statistical Area.

History
The county was formed in 1754 from Bladen County. It was named for Prince William Augustus, Duke of Cumberland (1721–1765), captain-general of the British army and victorious commander at the Battle of Culloden.

In 1771 parts of Cumberland County, Johnston County, and Orange County were combined to form Wake County. In July 1784 the western part of Cumberland County became Moore County; the eastern part became Fayette County in honor of the Marquis de la Fayette, but the name Cumberland County was restored three months later. The county was represented as Fayette County in the North Carolina General Assembly of April 1784. In 1855 the northern part of Cumberland County became Harnett County. Finally, in 1911 parts of Cumberland County and Robeson County were combined to form Hoke County.

Geography

State and local protected areas/sites 
 Bushy Lake State Natural Area
 Carvers Creek State Park
Oak Grove Plantation
 Old Linden School
 Rhodes Pond Public Fishing Area
Taliaferro’s Division Monument
 William T. Smith House

Major water bodies 
 Cape Fear River
 Carvers Creek
 Cross Creek
 Hope Mills Lake
 Little River (Cape Fear River tributary)
 Mingo Swamp (South River tributary)
 Rockfish Creek (Cape Fear River tributary)
 South River

Adjacent counties
 Harnett County - north
 Sampson County - east
 Bladen County - south
 Robeson County - southwest
 Hoke County - west
 Moore County - west

Major highways
 
 
 
 
 
 
 
 
 
 
 
 
 
 
 
 
  (Component highway for I-295)

Major infrastructure 
 Fayetteville Regional Airport
 Fayetteville Station
 Fort Bragg (part)
 Pope Army Airfield
 Simmons AAF, Military airfield.

Demographics

2020 census

As of the 2020 United States census, there were 334,728 people, 128,135 households, and 78,365 families residing in the county.

2010 census
As of the census of 2010,  302,963 people, 107,358 households, and 77,619 families resided in the county. The population density was 464 people per square mile (179/km2). The 118,425 housing units had an average density of 181 per square mile (70/km2). The racial makeup of the county was 55.15% White, 34.90% African American, 1.55% Native American, 1.88% Asian, 0.30% Pacific Islander, 3.13% from other races, and 3.09% from two or more races. About 6.90% of the population were Hispanics or Latinos of any race.

By 2005, Cumberland County's population was 51.5% non-Hispanic Whites, 36.7% African American, 6.4% Latino, 3.1% more than one race, 2.1% Asian, and 1.7% Native American.

Of the 107,358 households, 39.4% had children under 18 living with them, 52.9% were married couples living together, 15.5% had a female householder with no husband present, and 27.7% were not families. About 22.4% of all households were made up of individuals, and 5.9% had someone living alone who was 65 or older. The average household size was 2.65, and the average family size was 3.11.

In the county, the age distribution was 27.9% under 18, 13.7% from 18 to 24, 32.9% from 25 to 44, 17.8% from 45 to 64, and 7.7% who were 65 or older. The median age was 30.0 years. For every 100 females, there were 102.30 males. For every 100 females 18 and over, there were 101.90 males.

The median income for a household in the county was $37,466, and for a family was $41,459. Males had a median income of $28,308 versus $22,379 for females. The per capita income for the county was $17,376. About 10.4% of families and 12.8% of the population were below the poverty line, including 16.8% of those under age 18 and 13.70% of those 65 or over.

Government and politics
Cumberland County is a member of the regional Mid-Carolina Council of Governments.

Education
Cumberland County is home to Fayetteville State University (an HBCU in the CIAA Conference), Methodist University (a member of the USA South Athletic Conference), and Fayetteville Technical Community College.

The Cumberland County Schools district serves most areas for grades PK-12. The Department of Defense Education Activity (DoDEA) operates public schools on Fort Bragg for PK-8, but for high school Fort Bragg students attend local public schools in their respective counties. The Cuberland Schools system is the fourth largest public school system in the state of North Carolina. There are 17 high schools in Cumberland County: Cape Fear, Cross Creek Early College, Cumberland International Early College, Douglas Byrd, E.E. Smith, Fuller Performance Learning Center, Gray's Creek, Howard Health and Life Sciences, Jack Britt, Massey Hill Classical, Pine Forest, Reid Ross Classical, Seventy-First, South View, Terry Sanford, Alger B. Wilkins, Ramsey Street, and Westover.

Cumberland County Public Library and Information Center 
The Cumberland County Public Library & and Information Center began as the Fayetteville Library Society after being incorporated by the North Carolina General Assembly in 1794.  The Fayetteville Library Society was the first library organization or group to become incorporated in the state of North Carolina. The current library director is Ms. Jody Risacher   and she is also a member of the 2018 Library Board of Trustees for Cumberland County. Board of trustee members are appointed every three years by the Cumberland County Board of Commissioners.

Director Risacher was initially hired as the deputy director for the  Cumberland County Public Library and Information Center in the late 1990s and became the library's director in 2008. Director Risacher was named the Library Director of the Year by the North Carolina Public Library Association in 2013.

Cumberland County Public Library and Information Center has eight branches: Bordeaux Branch, Cliffdale Regional Branch, East Regional Branch, Headquarters Branch, Hope Mills Branch, North Regional Branch, Spring Lake Branch, and West Regional Branch. The newest branch is the West Regional Branch Library which opened in 2010, and the oldest branch was the Gillespie Street Branch, which originated as the James Walker Hood Library in 1942 and was a branch specifically for African Americans. Its mission statement is “The library opens windows to the world by encouraging expression, enlightenment, and exploration”.

In 2012, the Cumberland County Public Library and Information Center received the National Medal for Museum and Library Service, which is only awarded to five libraries in the United States each year.

In 2018, the Cumberland County Public Library and Information Center won two grants via the American Library Association  and the Arts Council of Cumberland County for a total of $5,300.00. One grant was used to support a pilot program at a local high school and the other to support the Cumberland County Storytelling Festival and Artrepreneur program.

The Cumberland County Court Library, which was previously located in the Judge E. Maurice Braswell Courthouse, moved to the Headquarters Library in February 2018. The Court Library is now situated in the Local and State History Room and collection materials are now available to the general public via local libraries. Library staff is available to assist patrons with finding information but they cannot offer patrons legal advice.

Some of the current services offered by the branch libraries include children's, young adult, and adult programming, genealogy and local history, homeschooling resources, and homework help for students. Cumberland County Public Library & Information Center offers patrons access to free downloads for audiobooks, ebooks, magazines, videos, and resources for education purposes. Patrons are able to access these resources remotely online via the use of the patron's library card number and pin. The library branches also offer computer training courses/classes, as well as story times, and opportunities for people or groups in the community to reserve spaces for meetings and programs.

Communities

City

 Fayetteville (county seat and largest city)

Towns

 Eastover
 Falcon
 Godwin
 Hope Mills
 Linden
 Spring Lake
 Stedman
 Wade

Census-designated place
 Vander

Other unincorporated communities
 Fort Bragg
Pope AAF

Townships

 Beaver Dam
 Black River
 Carvers Creek
 Cedar Creek
 Cross Creek
 Eastover
 Gray's Creek
 Manchester
 Pearces Mill
 Rockfish
 Seventy-First

See also
 List of counties in North Carolina
 National Register of Historic Places listings in Cumberland County, North Carolina
 North Carolina State Parks
 List of future Interstate Highways
 Lumbee Tribe of North Carolina, state-recognized tribe that resides in the county
 GenX, chemical compound found in the Cape Fear River south of Fayetteville

References

External links

 
 
 Cumberland County Schools

 
Fayetteville, North Carolina metropolitan area
1754 establishments in North Carolina
Populated places established in 1754
Majority-minority counties in North Carolina